Richard Oshlag is an American bridge player. He is a national champion. His wife, Mary Oshlag, was also a national champion.

Bridge accomplishments

Wins

 North American Bridge Championships (4)
 Truscott Senior Swiss Teams (1) 2011 
 Fast Open Pairs (2) 2017, 2018 
 Silodor Open Pairs (1) 2019

Runners-up

 North American Bridge Championships (4)
 Chicago Mixed Board-a-Match (1) 1989 
 North American Pairs (2) 2013, 2015 
 Fast Open Pairs (1) 2019 

The Chicago Mixed Board-A-Match is now known as the Freeman Mixed Board-A-Match.

Notes

American contract bridge players
Year of birth missing (living people)
Living people